Lancaster Theological Seminary is a seminary of the United Church of Christ in Lancaster, Pennsylvania. It was founded in 1825 by members of the German Reformed Church in the United States to provide theological education for prospective clergy and other church leaders.

History
After a failed attempt to open the school in Frederick, Maryland and another in Harrisburg, Pennsylvania, the school opened in Carlisle, Pennsylvania on the campus of Dickinson College on March 11, 1825, with a class of five students. Later lectures were held in the "old Reformed Church of Carlisle." At this time the seminary struggled financially and due to the fund raising campaign of James Ross Reily (1788–1884) the seminary was able to relocate to York in 1829. Here attendance averaged between 12 and 25 students.

In 1836–7 the seminary moved again to Mercersburg, Pennsylvania under the charter of Marshall College. Here the work of such celebrated professors as John Williamson Nevin, Friederich Augustus Rauch, and Philip Schaff gave rise to the Mercersburg theology, noted for its historic concerns for worship, sacraments, and Church in its ecumenical expressions.

In 1853 Marshall College moved to Lancaster, Pennsylvania, consolidating with Franklin College to form Franklin and Marshall College. In 1871, the seminary moved to the campus of Franklin and Marshall College in Lancaster. While viewed as a temporary arrangement, the present site of the seminary was not purchased until 1893. The buildings were completed and occupied in 1894.

For most of its history (109 of its 168 years), LTS was the sole seminary of the Reformed Church in the United States (German Reformed Church). With the formation of the Evangelical and Reformed Church in 1934, the seminary became one of three seminaries serving that newly united denomination. LTS is currently one of seven seminaries holding full relationship with the UCC, a denomination formed in 1957 by the union of the E&R Church and most of the Congregational Christian Churches.  Lancaster Theological Seminary is an official Open and affirming seminary.

See also
 Mercersburg theology

References

External links
 

Educational institutions established in 1925
Seminaries and theological colleges in Pennsylvania
Universities and colleges affiliated with the United Church of Christ
Reformed church seminaries and theological colleges
United Church of Christ in Pennsylvania
Universities and colleges in Lancaster, Pennsylvania
1925 establishments in Pennsylvania